Fissurella salvatiana is a species of sea snail, a marine gastropod mollusk in the family Fissurellidae, the keyhole limpets.

Description
The size of the shell attains 9 mm.

Distribution
This marine species occurs off the Cape Verdes.

References

 Rolán E., 2005. Malacological Fauna From The Cape Verde Archipelago. Part 1, Polyplacophora and Gastropoda.

Fissurellidae
Gastropods described in 1982